Luz Adriana Tovar Salgado (born 21 February 1983) is a Colombian racing cyclist. She won the Colombian National Road Race Championships in 2016.

Major results
Source: 

2010
 2nd Time trial, National Road Championships
2011
 3rd  Team pursuit, Pan American Track Championships
 6th Time trial, Pan American Road Championships
 8th Time trial, Pan American Games
2012
 3rd Time trial, National Road Championships
2013
 2nd Time trial, National Road Championships
2015
 1st Overall Vuelta a Cundinamarca
1st Stage 1
2016
 National Road Championships
1st  Road race
3rd Time trial
2017
 2nd Time trial, National Road Championships

References

External links
 

1983 births
Living people
Colombian female cyclists
People from Tolima Department
20th-century Colombian women
21st-century Colombian women